Barlyne is a locality in the North Burnett Region, Queensland, Australia.

History 
In the early 1890s, the Inman family selected land  from Gayndah which they called Barlyne. In 1917, the main industry was dairying but there were successful experiments with growing bananas, pawpaws and pineapples.

References 

North Burnett Region
Localities in Queensland